Momentos (Moments) is a 1982 album by Julio Iglesias. By 1984, the album sold over 1 million copies in Brazil. With sales of over 12 million, it is believed to be the best-selling Latin album of all-time.

Track listing
All tracks produced by Ramón Arcusa.

Personnel
Adapted from the Momentos liner notes:

Performance credits

Pepe Sánchez – drums
Carlos Villa – electric guitar, acoustic guitar
Eduardo Leyva – keyboards
Rafael Ferro – keyboards
Eduardo Gracia – bass guitar
Rafael Martínez – acoustic guitar
Martyn Ford – strings
Merche Macaria – chorus
Ana Navarrete – chorus
Mariví Navarrete – chorus

Technical credits

Ramón Arcusa – producer, orchestral arrangements and direction
Rafael Ferro – orchestral arrangements and direction 
Fernando Adour – technical realization in Portuguese
Juan Vinader – audio engineer
Bob Castle – audio engineer
Mike Ross – audio engineer
Faustino G. Molina – musicians coordinator of Madrid
Piatti & Wolk Design Assocciates, Inc. – graphic design
Peter Cunningham – photography

Charts

Weekly charts

Year-end charts

Decade-end charts

Certifications

See also 
 List of best-selling albums in Brazil
 List of best-selling albums of the 1980s (Japan)
 List of best-selling Latin albums

References

1982 albums
Julio Iglesias albums
Spanish-language albums
CBS Records albums